Paul Scully is an Australian politician who has been a member of the New South Wales Legislative Assembly since 12 November 2016, representing the seat of Wollongong for the Labor Party, since the by-election to replace Noreen Hay. He is currently the Shadow Minister for Planning and Public Spaces in the NSW Shadow Cabinet.

Before his election Scully was chief operating officer of the Australian Institute for Innovative Materials at the University of Wollongong. He is married to Alison Byrnes, the member for Cunningham since the 2022 federal election.

References

 

21st-century Australian politicians
Australian Labor Party members of the Parliament of New South Wales
Living people
Members of the New South Wales Legislative Assembly
Academic staff of the University of Wollongong
Year of birth missing (living people)